At the 1936 Winter Olympics, in Garmisch-Partenkirchen, Germany, in 1936, a military patrol competition was held. The International Olympic Committee refused admission of this sport into the Olympic Program, but the expressed desires of Adolf Hitler forced the IOC to make this program a demonstration sport. Military patrol is considered the precursor to biathlon.

The success of the Italian team was honored by Benito Mussolini with 30,000 lira per participant, because it was the first time that the Italians placed first in Nordic skiing at the Olympics.

Event held on February 14, 1936

References

External links
 

1936 Winter Olympics events
1936
1936 in biathlon
1936 in cross-country skiing
1936 in military history
Men's events at the 1936 Winter Olympics